The Watertown Expos were a professional minor league baseball team that existed from 1970 to 1971 in Watertown, South Dakota, playing two seasons in the Northern League at historic Watertown Stadium.

The Watertown Expos were a minor league affiliate of the Montreal Expos in both their seasons of play.

History

The Expos were preceded by the Watertown Cubs, who played as members of the Class D level Dakota League in 1921 and 1922 and South Dakota League in 1923. They were followed by the Watertown Lake Sox, who played in the collegiate summer minor league Basin League from 1954 to 1962. The Expos played in Watertown, beginning in 1970, as members of the  Class A level Northern League. The Watertown Expos were minor league affiliates of the Montreal Expos and adopted the corresponding moniker. When the Northern League folded after the 1971 season, the four remaining teams were the Aberdeen Pheasants, Sioux Falls Packers, St. Cloud Rox, and Watertown Expos.

The Watertown Expos finished in 4th place in both their seasons of play. In 1970, the team ended the season with a record of 32–38, finishing 16.5 games behind the 1st place Duluth-Superior Dukes, playing under manager Bobby Malkmus in the six–team league. In 1971, Watertown ended the 1971 season with a 30–40 record under manager Bob Oldis. In their final season of play, Watertown finished 12.0 games behind the 1st place St. Cloud Rox in the four–team league.

Watertown, South Dakota has not hosted another minor league team.

The ballpark
The Watertown minor league teams were noted to have played home games at Watertown Stadium. The ballpark is located at 1600 West Kemp Avenue, Watertown, South Dakota. Still in use today, the ballpark, constructed in 1940, is on the National Register of Historic Places.

Timeline

Year–by–year records

Notable alumni

Don Hopkins (1971)
Larry Lintz (1971)
Bobby Malkmus (1970, MGR)
Dale Murray (1970) 
Bob Oldis (1971, MGR)
Pat Scanlon (1970)
Tony Scott (1970)
Dan Warthen (1971)

See also
Watertown Expos players

References

External links
Baseball Reference

Watertown, South Dakota
Defunct minor league baseball teams
Defunct baseball teams in South Dakota
Baseball teams established in 1970
Northern League (1902-71) baseball teams
1970 establishments in South Dakota
Sports clubs disestablished in 1971
Montreal Expos minor league affiliates
1971 disestablishments in South Dakota
Baseball teams disestablished in 1971
Professional baseball teams in South Dakota